Lanthenans is a commune in the Doubs department in the Bourgogne-Franche-Comté region in eastern France.

Geography
The commune lies on a sunny slope with an exceptional microclimate and equidistant from L'Isle-sur-le-Doubs, Pont-de-Roide, and Clerval.

Population

See also
 Communes of the Doubs department

References

External links

 Lanthenans on the intercommunal Web site of the department 

Communes of Doubs